The 1977–78 New Orleans Jazz season was the team's fourth in the NBA. They began the season hoping to improve upon their 35–47 output from the previous season. They started the season going 6-2 and later in the season with a 16-24 record, the team managed to go on a 10-game winning streak and we're still in a playoff hunt with a 36-37 record before a 6-game losing streak dashed any playoff hopes for the fourth straight season, but still they finished the season with a 3-game winning streak and improved their 35-47 one year earlier by four wins, finishing 39–43.

Draft picks

Roster

Regular season

Season standings

z – clinched division title
y – clinched division title
x – clinched playoff spot

Record vs. opponents

Awards and records
 Pete Maravich, All-NBA Second Team

References

Utah Jazz seasons
New Orleans
New Orl
New Orl